The Associated Southern Colleges (ASC) is an association of independent schools in the Australian Capital Territory and southern New South Wales, Australia that share common interests, ethics, and educational philosophy, and contest sporting events among themselves.

Current member schools

Sports
ASC member schools compete against one another in a variety of inter-school sporting competitions. In addition to ASC competitions, ASC member schools often participate in ACTSSSA competitions (including all schools in ACT), Northside/Southside competitions (including schools located in Northern or Southern Canberra), and other sport-specific competitions, for example ACT Junior Rugby Union and Rowing ACT (including clubs from the general public).

The sports contested in ASC competitions include athletics, basketball, cricket, cross country running, hockey, netball, rugby union, and swimming.

The sports contested in independent competitions, but which include ASC member schools include Australian rules football, dragon boat racing, hockey, rowing, rugby union, squash, soccer, tennis, and water polo.

See also

List of non-government schools in the ACT
List of non-government schools in New South Wales

References 

Australian schools associations
Australian school sports associations
Private secondary schools in the Australian Capital Territory